João Chissano (born 26 July 1970) is a Mozambican former footballer who played as a defender. He played in 21 matches for the Mozambique national team from 1992 to 1998. He was also named in Mozambique's squad for the 1998 African Cup of Nations tournament.

References

External links
 

1970 births
Living people
Mozambican footballers
Association football defenders
Mozambique international footballers
1996 African Cup of Nations players
1998 African Cup of Nations players
Place of birth missing (living people)